Richard Tatum is an American voice and stage actor. He is known for his voice-over work in video games, movies and TV shows.

Biography
Richard Tatum is associate artistic director at the ARK Theatre Company in Los Angeles, where his productions of The Country Wife  by William Wycherley, The London Cuckholds, On the Verge, and Good have received serious critical attention - his script adaptation of The Country Wife was nominated for a 2010 LA Weekly Theatre Award. He appeared in a production of A Doll's House for that company, earning Best Supporting Male nomination from the LA Weekly Theatre Awards. Tatum also appeared in the 2003 independent film production of Shakespeare's Merchant in the comedic role of the Prince of Aragon.

Filmography

Video games
Arcanum: Of Steamworks and Magick Obscura – Geoffrey Tarellond-Ashe
Call of Duty: Black Ops III – Additional voices
Civilization VI – Theodore "Teddy" Roosevelt
Dark Reign 2 – Additional voices
Destroy All Humans! 2 – Additional voices
Disney Infinity 3.0 – Biggs Darklighter, Additional voices
Fallout 4 – Rex Goodman, Vault-Tec Scientist, Issac Karlin
Final Fantasy XIV – Sthalmann, PC Roegadyn
Final Fantasy XV - Additional voices
Final Fantasy VII Remake - Additional voices
Genshin Impact – Pierro
Grand Theft Auto V – The Local Population
Kung Fu Panda – Additional voices
Lego Jurassic World – Additional voices
Mafia III – Additional voices
Mercenaries 2: World in Flames – American Soldier
Octopath Traveler II – Roque
Red Faction: Guerrilla – Additional voices
Saints Row 2 – Additional voices
Skylanders: Imaginators – Countdown (uncredited)
Skylanders: SuperChargers – Countdown
Skylanders: Swap Force – Countdown
Skylanders: Trap Team – Countdown
Spyro: Year of the Dragon – Agent 9
Spyro Reignited Trilogy - Agent 9, Bartholomew
Star Ocean: Integrity and Faithlessness – Doctor Krupp
Takedown: Red Sabre – Additional voices
The Sopranos: Road to Respect – Additional voices
World of Final Fantasy – Segwarides, Rorrik Farna, Knight in the Golden Mask

TV series
Awkward Embraces – IT Guy, Richard
Pet Star – Judge
Red Handed – The Boss
Spy TV – Various
Suspense – Self, Lawrence Tiernan, Porky, Captain Plesser, Reverend Abernathy, Mr. Weisz, Doctor Laskey, Maltzer, Detective Palumbo, William Harker, High Priest, Assistant D.A. Berger
We're Alive – Pippin

Films/TV movies
HBO: The Making of 'The Sopranos: Road to Respect' – Multiple characters
Shakespeare's Merchant – Prince of Aragon
Starry Night – X-Ray Technician
The Trojan Women – Newscaster

Shorts
Adventures in Odyssey: The Journal of John Avery Whittaker – Additional voices
Clever Girl – Rabbi
Health & Disorder – Additional voices
Moving Millie – Movie Theater Stranger
The Break Up – Rachel's Boss

Animation voice roles
As Told by Ginger – Javier
Santa's Apprentice – Waldorf
Static Shock – Omar Harmozi
The Magic Snowflake – Waldorf

Anime voice roles
Cagaster of an Insect Cage – Jin

Notes and references

External links

Living people
American male stage actors
American male voice actors
American theatre directors
Year of birth missing (living people)